Pseudobombax is a genus of flowering plants in the subfamily Bombacoideae of the family Malvaceae.

The genus ranges across tropical South America, Central America, Mexico, Cuba, Hispaniola, and the Windward Islands.

Selected species
 Pseudobombax argentinum (R.E.Fr.) A.Robyns – Soroche ( Argentina, Bolivia, Brazil, Paraguay)
 Pseudobombax ellipticum (Kunth) Dugand – Shaving brush tree (Mexico, El Salvador, Guatemala, Honduras)
 Pseudobombax grandiflorum (Cav.) A.Robyns
 Pseudobombax guayasense A.Robyns (Ecuador)
 Pseudobombax longiflorum (Mart.) A.Robyns
 Pseudobombax millei (Standl.) A.Robyns – Beldaco (Ecuador)
 Pseudobombax septenatum (Jacq.) Dugand
 Pseudobombax tomentosum (Mart. & Zucc.) A.Robyns

References

External links

 
Malvaceae genera
Taxonomy articles created by Polbot
Neotropical realm flora